Santiago de Chilcas District is one of ten districts of the Ocros Province in Peru.

Alternative Names: Cerro Niumay

Type: Mountain - an elevation standing high above the surrounding area with small summit area, steep slopes and local relief of 300m or more

References

Districts of the Ocros Province
Districts of the Ancash Region